Speed Racer: The Videogame is a racing video game developed by Sidhe Interactive for the PlayStation 2 and Wii consoles, by Virtuos for the Nintendo DS and by Glu Mobile for mobile phones; and published by Warner Bros. Games and Glu Mobile. It is a tie-in to the 2008 film of the same name, set one year after its events. The actors from the movie reprise their role in the video game counterpart. The mobile version was released in April 2008, and the Nintendo versions were released on May 6, 2008, with the PlayStation 2 version being released on September 16, 2008, alongside the DVD and Blu-ray release.  Due to the short development time allotted, Warner Bros. chose not to release the game on other contemporary non-Nintendo platforms.

Gameplay 
The game is a racing game similar to the F-Zero series, including tracks full of odd twists, turns and loops which are impossible by realistic standards, set in five vibrant, exotic locations (six in the PS2 version). The goal of the game is not only to win first place in each race, but also to have the most points by the end of the cup to win the competition. Points can be earned by placing high during races, but also by performing stunts and, most commonly, bashing into and destroying other racers with the use of car acrobatics, called "car-fu" in the game. Driving well (i.e., avoiding accidents) as well as car-fu rewards the player with a boost. Four boosts may be collected this way, and may be used at any time. If all four boosts are used at once by quadruple-tapping the boost button, the driver enters a state called "The Zone" in which they travel more than twice as fast as their regular top speed, become invincible and inflict high damage to any opponents they hit. Boosts may alternatively be used to repair the car by refilling the health meter. A full boost will repair half of the health meter, while a partially filled boost meter will only repair a smaller amount of the meter. The player can distinguish the vehicle's health by the gauge on the HUD, but also the color of the jet at the rear of the vehicle: if it is bluish-white, the car is fine; if it is red and smoking, it is severely damaged; if the camera suddenly starts to zoom out, the car is about to explode. If this happens, the player must quickly repair their car, or else it will, in fact, explode. If the player's car explodes, the player will respawn nearby; however, the brief delay between the car exploding and re-spawning allows many other drivers to pass the player, causing a large dent in their ranking.

Each version of the game has its own unique control method. The PS2 version uses a standard control setup, in which an analog stick controls steering and buttons are used for pedals and car-fu moves.  The Nintendo DS version is played entirely with d-pad and buttons, although the player can tap the touch screen to zoom in and out on a position meter that it displays.  The Wii version can only be played by the Wii Remote itself turned sideways, with or without the Wii Wheel, leveraging its motion controls to steer and perform stunt and car-fu moves; analog control is not supported in that version as it does not allow external attachments that feature analog sticks.

There are a total of 20 selectable characters from the film in the game (25 in the PS2 version), each with their own unique vehicle. Each character also has a specific rival, whom, should the player destroy or finish the race before, award bonus points. For example, Speed Racer's rival is Jack "Cannonball" Taylor. In certain gameplay modes, players can enter alliances with other racers, who will attempt to interfere with the player's rival. Performing "car-fu" on allies will penalize the player, however. Each character's car has different stats, of which there are 4 in total.

Soundtrack 
The original musical soundtrack of the Speed Racer video game was composed by Winifred Phillips and produced by Winnie Waldron. It has received positive reviews. Reviewer Sam Bishop of IGN wrote, "The music in the game happily bounces back and forth from vaguely tribal, ambient tracks to more driving, aggressive sounding electronica loops."

Reception 

The DS version received "generally favorable reviews", while the PlayStation 2 and Wii versions received "average" reviews, according to the review aggregation website Metacritic. In Japan, Famitsu gave it a score of one five, one seven, and two sixes for the DS version. Similar to the film, the game has also garnered many positive reviews from fans over time, though more obscure.

References

External links 
 
 
 

2008 video games
Gamebryo games
Mobile games
Nintendo DS games
PlayStation 2 games
Wii games
Wii Wheel games
Speed Racer video games
Video games based on films
Video games based on adaptations
Video games developed in New Zealand
Video games developed in China
Video games developed in the United States
Video games scored by Winifred Phillips
Warner Bros. video games
Glu Mobile games
Multiplayer and single-player video games
Sidhe (company) games
Virtuos games